Les Hunter is a fictional character from the British Channel 4 soap opera Hollyoaks, played by John Graham Davies.

Development
On the official Hollyoaks website, Les is described as "stubborn and strong-minded, but cursed with a fondness for alcohol." Les's mother Lillian Hunter (Judith Barker) was introduced in early 2003. Producer Jo Hallows said Lillian represents every in-law people dread coming to stay, and called her "a witch". She also explained "You start to see why Les turned out the way he did!"

Les has "weathered a rocky marriage" to Sally Hunter (Katherine Dow-Blyton) but the pair manage to reconcile. Les' eldest daughter, Ellie Mills (Sarah Baxendale) went missing in Ibiza for two years but later returns home. The ordeal left Les relying on alcohol to seek comfort from her disappearance. Les also has a problematic relationship with his son Lee (Alex Carter) . When Lee fails his exams he decides to train as a beautician at college. Les is disapproving of Lee choosing a career he believes to be feminine. Carter told reporters from All About Soap that "I think Mr Hunter is worried as well. He wants his son to do something a bit more manly!"

Les' departure was part of what the Sunday Mirror described as the "biggest massacre in soap history". His exit coincided with the exits of the majority of the Hunter family: Lisa (Gemma Atkinson), Lee and Sally. His departure storyline featured Les and Sally moving to Cyprus, following the death of their son Dan (Andrew McNair). Just before they plan to leave, Sally declares she cannot leave because she has a phobia of aeroplanes. Lee tries to hypnotise Sally and cure her, but his attempts fail. Les purchases a motorbike complete with a sidecar and convinces Sally to go ahead with their move. Sally takes the driver's seat and Les gets into the side car as they leave the village for good. The character made his final appearance on 4 November 2005.

Storylines
Les arrives in the village as the moody husband of Sally and father of Ellie, Dan, Lee and Lisa. He was strict on his youngest daughter Lisa and had owned the garage "Hunter and Sons", with his son Dan. Shortly, Sally arrives, and Les and Sally went through a rough patch when daughter Ellie had gone missing. Les became depressed about his family problems and he would drown his sorrows with alcohol. Soon, though daughter Ellie arrived after two years, but things got bad to worse. Les was angered by the attitude Ellie had after her arrival, and Les was frustrated when he discovered that Lisa harms herself. With all these family problems going on, Les was even more shocked when his business was not doing too well, and son Dan ended up getting himself involved with Dodgy motors. Les was furious with Dan, and the police got involved, which resulted to the garage being closed down. Les turned to alcohol again, and argued with Sally further, but the situation became worse when he raised his hand towards her. Following the incident, Les was thrown out, and finally decided to get his act together. Les began to give up his drink, and soon got a new job as a lorry driver, a business venture he started with newcomer Johnno Dean (Mark Powley), who he soon became close friends with. Les moved back in with his family, however more trouble arrived when Dan was arrested for murder. The scenario of Dan being arrested was to be one whole nightmare for Les and his family as later he would discover.

Les's son-in-law Toby Mills (Henry Luxemburg) was pushed off a building by Dan, while Ellie also fell off as she was struggling to fight for her life. Toby had died and Dan was in shock as he heard Ellie fighting with Toby, as Ellie confessed to him that her husband was a serial killer. However, it all got too much for Les as Dan was arrested for the serial killing murders and Ellie sent him down after she testified against him in court. With both Sally and Lisa arguing against Ellie, again Les turned to his alcohol addiction. To make matters worse still, Les and Johnno's workplace collapsed at this time, leaving both parties unemployed and in massive debt, and this pushed Les even closer to the edge. But eventually things began to get better when Ellie realised Dan's innocence and retracted her testimony. Dan was released, but it was short-lived, as he died in his rally race. Les comfort his family as they how to cope yet with another tragedy. Les realised with all this terrible times for him and his family, he had to support them as he managed to avoid alcohol. Slowly, the Hunter family began to rebuild their lives, but youngest daughter Lisa had an affair with an older man, none other than Jake Dean (Kevin Sacre), the son of Les' former business partner Johnno, who by that time had left Hollyoaks; but after a rash reaction, eventually Les realised that he had to try a new approach in order to get the best from his children. With many bad memories in Hollyoaks, Les decided a move away would be good along with wife Sally as a fresh start is what the pair need. Therefore, Les said farewell along with wife Sally on a motorbike as they had sold up to live in Cyprus.

Reception
A writer from Whats On Stage branded Les the "alcoholic dad".

References

External links
 Character profile at Hollyoaks.com

Hollyoaks characters
Television characters introduced in 2001
Male characters in television